The second season of the Singaporean reality talent show Project SuperStar began on 8 November 2006 on MediaCorp Channel U. The show is hosted by Quan Yi Fong and Jeff Wang. The overall winner received talent management contracts with Warner Music Singapore and MediaCorp. Billy Koh, Lee Wei Song, Roy Loi, Anthony Png and Dawn Yip returned as judges for their second season.

On 4 February 2007, winner of the male category Daren Tan was announced as the overall winner of the season, with female category winner Lydia Tan as the overall runner-up. Tan was also the first previously eliminated contestant on Project SuperStar to win the competition. 

The competition also introduced to Jeremy Chan who would later become a full-time Mediacorp actor, runner-up Tan and Carrie Yeo would later form into a duo band The Freshmen, and Kelvin Soon, a prominent singer-songwriter.

Judges and hosts

Development
Season 2 was broadcast from 8 November 2006 to 4 February 2007. When the auditions are launched in early September, over 6,000 aspirants came to audition, breaking the record of all star-searching contests in Singapore.

The finalist were announced on an unknown date. Singer-songwriter Tay Kewei was originally selected as one of the final 24 finalists, but was later disqualified due to contractual violation. She was replaced by Sheila Ou, a contestant who was originally eliminated in the round three auditions.

Finalists
Key:
 – Winner
 – Runner-up
 – Gender/Category runner-up
 – Semi-finalist
 – Category 6th-8th place (lost wildcard)
 - Advanced via wildcard

Live shows

Musical guests

Results summary

Live show details

Week 1: Quarter-finals 1 (22/23 November)
Theme: No Theme

Week 2: Quarter-finals 2 (29/30 November)

Week 3: Quarter-finals 3 (6/7 December)
Theme: Retro Night (songs from 80s to 90s)

Week 4: Quarter-finals 4 (13/14 December)
Theme: Retro Night (songs from 80s to 90s)

Week 5: Revival Round (20/21 December)
Theme: No theme
The eight contestants who were eliminated from the third and fourth quarter-finals returned to the stage to perform for the revival round. The contestant who received the highest combined score from either the male and female categories would be reinstated from the competition.

Week 6: Semi-Finals 1 (4/5 January)
Theme: Medley of slow and dance songs

Week 7: Semi-Finals 2 (11/12 January)
Theme: Oldies night (Songs from 40s to 70s)

Week 8: Semi Finals 3 (18/19 January)
Theme: Theme songs from local dramas and films

Week 9: Category Final (25/26 January)
Theme: Songs to get to the finals (no theme), English songs, Winner's single

Week 10: Finals Prelude (31 January/1 February)

Week 11: Finals (4 February)
Theme: Unplugged song, Jazz song, Hip-hop song, Rock song, Winner's song
Group performances:

References

External links

2007 Singaporean television seasons